Gothic writing may refer to 
 Writing in a Gothic language 
 Writing using a Greek and runic based Gothic alphabet
 Writing using a Blackletter Gothic script for Latin-based alphabets
 18th century and later Gothic fiction combining horror and romance